The Pioneer Scout is a 1928 American silent Western film directed by Lloyd Ingraham and Alfred L. Werker and written by Garrett Graham and Frances Marion. The film stars Fred Thomson, Nora Lane, William Courtright and Tom Wilson. The film was released on January 21, 1928, by Paramount Pictures.

Cast 
 Fred Thomson as Fred
 Nora Lane as Mary Baxter
 William Courtright as Old Bill
 Tom Wilson as Handy Anderson

References

External links 
 

1928 films
1920s English-language films
1928 Western (genre) films
Paramount Pictures films
Films directed by Lloyd Ingraham
Films directed by Alfred L. Werker
American black-and-white films
Silent American Western (genre) films
1920s American films